Bornholdt is a surname. Notable people with the surname include:

Gavin Bornholdt (1947–2011), New Zealand sailor
Jenny Bornholdt (born 1960), New Zealand poet
Manon Bornholdt (born 1950), German long jumper
Niels Peter Bornholdt (1842–1924), Danish shipping agent and landowner